Liverpool Fútbol Club is a Uruguayan football club based in Montevideo. The team was first promoted to the Primera División in 1919 and plays its home games at Estadio Belvedere.

History
The club has its roots in the student team from the Catholic Capuchin school in Nuevo París, which began playing in 1908. The club took on the name Liverpool as there were many cultural links between the two areas; the majority of coal ships arriving in Montevideo came from the English port. A number of clubs took on Anglicised names, such as league rivals Montevideo Wanderers; in this case, the team paid homage to Liverpool FC.

Liverpool plays home matches in Estadio Belvedere (Belvedere Stadium), formerly owned by the Montevideo Wanderers.

In 2019 Liverpool won the Torneo Intermedio, their first 1st division title. In 2020, they won the Supercopa Uruguaya for the first time and finished a historic year by capturing the Torneo Clausura for the first time in its history.

Kit evolution

Source: Liverpool (Montevideo) Page – BDFA.com.ar

CONMEBOL appearances

Current squad

Managers

 Danilo Hodgisi
  Eugenio "Pato" Galvalisi (19??−66)
  José Sasía (1976)
  Gerardo Pelusso (1991)
  Julio César Antúnez (Jan 1, 1997 – Jan 1, 1999)
  Julio César Ribas (Jan 1, 2002 – March 22, 2004)
  Carlos Barcos (March 22, 2004 – Aug 31, 2005)
  Juan Tejera (July 1, 2006 – May 21, 2007)
  Carlos Manta (July 1, 2007 – Nov 26, 2007)
  Eduardo Favaro (Jan 1, 2008 – June 9, 2011)
  Diego Demarco (June 16, 2011 – Oct 3, 2011)
  Julio César Antúnez (Oct 4, 2011 – Nov 5, 2012)
  José Puente (Nov 6, 2012 – Dec 14, 2012)
  Raúl Moeller (Jan 1, 2013 – June 2, 2013)
  Eduardo Favaro (June 26, 2013–1?)
  Juan Verzeri (2015)
  Mario Saralegui (2016)
  Alejandro Bertoldi (2016-)
  ??? (?)
  Paulo Pezzolano (2017-2019)
  Román Cuello (2019-2020)
  Marcelo Méndez (2020-2021)

Honours

 Primera División: 2020 Clausura
 2022 Apertura

 Torneo Intermedio: 12019

 Supercopa Uruguaya: 22020, 2023Segunda División: 4 1966, 1987, 2002, 2014–15

 Divisional Intermedia: 2 1919, 1937Tercera División Uruguay: 11916

 Liga Uruguaya de Football Amateur: 1'''
 1934

Other sports
Liverpool FC had a basketball team until the 1990s, playing in the stadium that still exists behind the north tribune of Estadio Belvedere. The team never reached the first division.

References

External links

 

 
1915 establishments in Uruguay
Football clubs in Uruguay
Association football clubs established in 1915
Prado, Montevideo